EPSO may refer to:
European Personnel Selection Office, agency to hire staff for the European Union
Hellenic Socialist Patriotic Organisation, a collaborationist organization in Greece during World War II
Evolutionary particle swarm optimization and enhanced particle swarm optimization, types of particle swarm optimization